Mere Bhaiya is a 1972 Bollywood drama film directed by Satyen Bose. The film stars Vijay Arora and Suresh Chatwal.

Cast
 Amrit Lakhanpal as Villain
Vijay Arora as Subhash Sharma 
Nazima as Laxmi Sharma 
Master Satyajeet as young Subhash
Suresh Chatwal as Avinash 
Anita Dutt as Saraswati 
V. Gopal as Police Inspector Shukla 
Bipin Gupta as Advocate Pandit Deodhar Sharma 
Durga Khote as Avinash's Mother 
Murad as Police Inspector 
Sulochana Chatterjee as Saraswati's Mother 
Tarun Ghosh as Tarun 
Moolchand   
Shail Chaturvedi as Publisher 
Raman Kumar as Ranga Tripathi 
Manisha as Kaminibai

Soundtrack
The music of the film was composed by Salil Chowdhury, while lyrics were penned by Yogesh.

"Chhod Gali" - Lata Mangeshkar
"Pyaas Liya Hai Manwa" - Lata Mangeshkar
"Chanchal Man Par" - Manna Dey
"Marzi Hai Tumhari" - Manna Dey and Lata Mangeshkar
"Mere Bhaiya" - Sushma Shreshta

External links
 

1972 films
1970s Hindi-language films
1972 drama films
Rajshri Productions films
Films scored by Salil Chowdhury